The Austin-McDonald House, at 501 Rio Grande in Aztec, New Mexico, was built in 1910.  It was listed on the National Register of Historic Places in 1985.  It has also been known as Koogler House.

It was built as a one-story four-room adobe house, and later expanded to include a wood frame second story.

References

		
National Register of Historic Places in San Juan County, New Mexico
Houses completed in 1910